The 1931 Colorado Silver and Gold football team was an American football team that represented the University of Colorado as a member of the Rocky Mountain Conference (RMC) during the 1931 college football season. Led by Myron E. Witham in his 12th and final season as head coach, Colorado compiled an overall record of 5–3 with a mark of 3–2 in conference play, tying for fourth place in the RMC.

Schedule

References

Colorado
Colorado Buffaloes football seasons
Colorado Silver and Gold football